The Cuban Pacification Medal (Army) is a military award of the United States Army which was created by orders of the United States War Department on May 11, 1909. The medal was created to recognize service during the United States occupation of Cuba from 1906 to 1909.

To be awarded the Cuban Pacification Medal (Army), a service member was required to serve in the United States occupation force, garrisoned on the island of Cuba between the dates of October 6, 1906, and April 1, 1909. The Cuban Pacification Medal (Navy) was also issued to naval personnel who served ashore in Cuba between the dates of September 12, 1906, and April 1, 1909, or who were attached to any of a number of ships serving in the area within this timeframe.

There was no time limit required for presentation of the award, and a service member could technically receive the Cuban Pacification Medal (Army) for only a few days of service.

A similar decoration, known as the Army of Cuban Occupation Medal, also existed for those who had served in the initial occupation of Cuba after the Spanish–American War.

References

Cuba–United States relations
United States service medals